Mount Quackenbush is a flat-topped mountain in Antarctica, 2,435 m, which forms a projecting angle along the steep cliffs bordering the north side of Byrd Glacier, just west of Peckham Glacier. It was named by the Advisory Committee on Antarctic Names (US-ACAN) for Captain Robert S. Quackenbush, Jr., chief of staff to Admiral Cruzen (Central Group of Task Force 68) in U.S. Navy Operation Highjump, 1946–47, led by Admiral Byrd.

Mountains of Oates Land
Britannia Range (Antarctica)